The Ostropales are an order of fungi in the class Lecanoromycetes.  The order was circumscribed by Swedish botanist John Axel Nannfeldt in 1932. The order contains 4 families and 46 genera, including 6 genera of uncertain familial placement.

Families and genera
Odontotremataceae 
Claviradulomyces – 2 spp.
Coccomycetella – 2 spp.
Odontotrema – 7 spp.
Odontura – 1 sp.
Paschelkiella – 1 sp.
Potriphila – 3 spp.
Rogellia – 2 spp.
Stromatothecia – 1 sp.
Tryblis – 2 spp.
Xerotrema – 2 spp.

Phaneromycetaceae 
Phaneromyces – 2 spp.

Spirographaceae 
Spirographa – 5 spp.

Stictidaceae 
Absconditella – 12 spp.
Acarosporina – 5 spp.
Biostictis – 5 spp.
Carestiella – 2 sp.
Conotremopsis – 1 sp.
Cryptodiscus – 15 spp. *
Cyanodermella – 2 spp.
Delpontia – 1 sp.
Fitzroyomyces – 1 sp.
Geisleria – 4 spp.
Glomerobolus – 1 sp.
Ingvariella – 1 sp.
Karstenia – 10 spp.
Lillicoa – 4 spp.
Nanostictis – ca. 8 spp.
Neofitzroyomyces – 1 sp.
Ostropa – 1 sp.
Propoliopsis – 1 sp.
Robergea – 8 spp.
Schizoxylon – ca. 35 spp.
Sphaeropezia – 19 spp.
Stictis – 4 spp.
Stictophacidium – 3 spp.
Thelopsis – 9 spp.
Topelia – 6 spp.
Trinathotrema – 3 spp.
Xyloschistes – 1 sp.

Ostropales genera of unknown familial placement:
Aabaarnia  – 1 sp.
Biazrovia  – 1 sp.
Elongaticonidia  – 1 sp.
Normanogalla  – 1 sp.

References

 
Lecanoromycetes orders
Lichen orders
Taxa named by John Axel Nannfeldt
Taxa described in 1932